The Nerodimka or the Nerodime is a mountain range located in the south of Kosovo. It is named after the Serbian legend of the woman who cannot deliver a baby (meaning "woman who cannot give birth"). The mountain has two high peaks, Bukova Glava  and Kurkulica .

Geography

The Nerodimka/Nerodime mountains are located just a few kilometers north of the Sharr Mountains, only split by the Siriniq Valley. Nerodime forms a continuous east–west range along with the mountains of Zhar and Jezerska planina between the cities of Prizren and Ferizaj. In the mountain originates the Nerodime river, a left tributary of the Lepenc. Many small streams originate on the mountain and then flow downwards to meet the Lepenc.

Cities, towns and villages

Cities located near the mountain are:
Ferizaj (north-east)

Towns located near the mountain are:
Mushtisht (west)
Gremë (east)
Shtërpcë (south)

Villages located near the mountain are:
Nerodimja e Epërme (north-east)
Jezerc (north)
Bukosh (west)
Gaçkë (south-east)                                   
Brezovicë (south)
Burrnik (south)

References

Mountains of Kosovo